is a Japanese FM station that is run by TMO Omagari in Daisen, Akita, Japan.

Stations
Omagari 87.3 Mhz 20W 
Nangai 87.3 Mhz 20W 
Kyowa 87.3 Mhz 20W 
Kyowa Funaoka 87.3 Mhz 5W 
Ioka 87.3 Mhz 3W

Programs
Uchiagero Go!Go!Akita Northern Happinets!!
Aoi Inazuma Blaublitz Akita

Programs in Akita dialect
Jisama no agura, Basama no henaga

References

Radio stations in Japan
Radio stations established in 2015
Mass media in Akita Prefecture